Lervik is a village by the Skälderviken bay on the Bjärehalvön peninsula in Båstad Municipality. Lervik is situated north of a larger village next to it, named Stora Hult. In the center of Lervik there is a harbor, where only small boats such as sailboats and motorboats are moored. It had 863 inhabitants in 2010. Though still a fishing village but it is today known as a summer resort

In Lervik there are a number of houses and a few summer cottages. There was a fishmonger but it closed ín the early nineties.

Populated places in Skåne County